Košarkaški klub Fair Play, commonly referred to as KK Fair Play, was a men's basketball club based in Niš, Serbia. In 2021, it was merged into Subotica-based team Spartak.

History 
In the inaugural season (2017–18), the club won the Second Regional League of Serbia, East Division, and got promoted to the First Regional League of Serbia, East Division. In the 2018–19 season, they won the First Regional League and got promoted to the Second Basketball League of Serbia for the 2019–20 season.

In May 2021, there were talks to merge into a Subotica-based club Spartak. In August 2021, the Basketball Federation of Serbia confirmed a disaffiliation of the club and theirs merge into Spartak.

Players

Head coaches 

  Ljubiša Damjanović (2017–2019)
  Srećko Sekulović (2019)
  Saša Jović (2019–2020)
  Vladan Glavinić (2020–2021)

Season by season

Trophies and awards

Trophies
 First Regional League, East Division (3rd-tier)
 Winners (1): 2018–19

 Second Regional League, East Division (4th-tier)
 Winners (1): 2017–18

See also 
Basketball clubs in Niš
Konstantin
Ergonom (defunct)

References

External links
 
 Profile at srbijasport.net 
 Profile at eurobasket.com

Fair Play
Fair Play

Fair Play
Fair Play
Sport in Niš